Auburn railway station is located on the Lilydale, Belgrave and Alamein lines in Victoria, Australia. It serves the eastern Melbourne suburb of Hawthorn East, and it opened on 3 April 1882 as Auburn Road. It was renamed Auburn on 1 September of that year.

History

Auburn station opened on 3 April 1882, when the railway line from Hawthorn was extended to Camberwell. The station was named after two nearby residences which were built in the 1850s. Reverend Henry Liddiard's Auburn Lodge was built south of Burwood Road, between Glenferrie and Auburn Roads, while John Collings' Auburn House was built south of Liddiard's residence in the present day Goodall Street.

The current two-storey station building dates back to 1916, when the line between Hawthorn and Camberwell was regraded. It features brick and stucco facades punctuated by arches, and is listed on the Victorian Heritage Register.

In 1963, a third line was provided between Hawthorn and Camberwell. These works included a new Up platform (Platform 1), with Platform 2 becoming a bi-directional platform.

Platforms and services

Auburn has one island platform with two faces and one side platform. It is serviced by Metro Trains' Lilydale, Belgrave and Alamein line services.

Platform 1:
  weekday all stations and limited express services to Flinders Street
  all stations and limited express services to Flinders Street
  all stations and limited express services to Flinders Street

Platform 2:
  all stations services to Lilydale
  all stations services to Belgrave

Platform 3:
  weekday all stations services to Lilydale; weekday all stations services to Blackburn
  weekday all stations services to Belgrave; weekday all stations services to Blackburn
  weekday all stations services to Alamein

Transport links

CDC Melbourne operates one route via Auburn station, under contract to Public Transport Victoria:
 : Kew – Oakleigh station

References

External links
 
 Melway map at street-directory.com.au

Heritage-listed buildings in Melbourne
Railway stations in Melbourne
Railway stations in Australia opened in 1882
Romanesque Revival architecture in Australia
Listed railway stations in Australia
Railway stations in the City of Boroondara